Islahuddin Siddique (born 10 January 1948), also spelled Islah-ud-Din Siddiqui, is a field hockey player from Pakistan. He was born in Meerut, India.

A right winger from Pakistan, he led Pakistan to Hockey World Cup glory in 1978. Not only did Pakistan win the World Cup  under his captaincy but it completed a grand slam by winning the Champions Trophy and an Asian Games Gold medal as well in 1978.

Islahuddin Siddiqui played between 1967 and 1978, he was capped 130 times and scored 137 goals. He won the Silver medal in the 1972 Summer Olympics at Munich, W. Germany and a Bronze medal in the 1976 Summer Olympics at Montreal. Islahuddin was member of team that won 1971 World Cup under Captaincy of Khalid Mehmood in Barcelona. He was Captain of 1975 World Cup runner-up team and 1978 World Cup 
Winning team. In 1990 he was manager of Pakistan team that was Runner up in the World cup played in Lahore, Pakistan.

After his retirement from the sport, he has been associated with hockey as a coach and manager of the Pakistani National Team along with commentator and member of the FIH rules board. FIH awarded him the greatest award in hockey services, the diploma of merit, in recognition of his international hockey services.
He was also the captain of the Pakistan hockey team in 45 test matches (43 matches were won and 2 matches ended in a draw). Islahuddin Siddique was capped 130 times and scored 137 goals
He was a gold medalist in the 1970 Asian games (Bangkok)
Islahuddin Siddique is also author of book " Dash Through My Life".

Career
 Islahuddin Siddique was capped 130 times and scored 137 goals
 He was a gold medalist in the 1970 Asian Games held at Bangkok
 Islahuddin Siddique won a gold medal in the first world cup in Barcelona (1971)
 He was also the manager and chief coach of 'Asian Eleven' in 1990 and then 'Asian Eleven' won the tournament of the 5 continents.

Awards and recognition
 Pride of Performance Award by the President of Pakistan in 1982
 Sitara-i-Imtiaz Award by the President of Pakistan in 2010
 Plans for a new hockey academy and stadium in Karachi were announced in January 2010. This academy will help the sportsmen in Karachi to use the facilities for developing their skills. Karachi Saddar Town administrator told reporters on the occasion that naming the academy after legendary hockey player like Islahuddin was to honour him for his services to the game of hockey.

See also
 Pakistan Hockey Federation

References

External links
 

1948 births
Living people
Pakistani male field hockey players
Olympic field hockey players of Pakistan
Olympic silver medalists for Pakistan
Olympic bronze medalists for Pakistan
Olympic medalists in field hockey
Medalists at the 1976 Summer Olympics
Medalists at the 1972 Summer Olympics
Field hockey players at the 1972 Summer Olympics
Field hockey players at the 1976 Summer Olympics
Asian Games medalists in field hockey
Field hockey players at the 1970 Asian Games
Field hockey players at the 1974 Asian Games
Field hockey players at the 1978 Asian Games
Pakistani field hockey coaches
Recipients of the Pride of Performance
Muhajir people
People from Meerut
Field hockey players from Karachi
Asian Games gold medalists for Pakistan
Medalists at the 1970 Asian Games
Medalists at the 1974 Asian Games
Medalists at the 1978 Asian Games
1978 Men's Hockey World Cup players